Binns is an English surname.

Notable people with this surname include:

 Alfred Binns (born 1929), West Indian cricketer
 Archie Binns (1899–1971), American author
 Armon Binns (born 1989), American football player
 Bartholomew Binns (1839–1911), English executioner
 Charles Fergus Binns (1857–1935), American ceramic artist
 Cuthbert Binns, character in the Harry Potter series
 Edward Binns, (1916–1990), American actor
 Eric Binns (1924–2007), English footballer
 George Binns (1815–1847), New Zealand chartist
 Graham Binns, British general
 Henry Binns (1837–1899), Prime Minister of Natal
 Jack R. Binns (born 1933), American diplomat
 James Jepson Binns (–1928), English pipe organ builder
 John Binns (disambiguation)
 Joseph Binns (1900–1975), British politician
 Kathryn Binns (born 1958), English long-distance runner
 Ken Binns (born 1935), Canadian squash player 
 Malcolm Binns (born 1936), British pianist
 Michael Binns (born 1988), Jamaican footballer
 Pat Binns (born 1948), 30th Premier of Prince Edward Island, Canada
 Ricardo C. Binns (born 1945), American marine
 Steve Binns (born 1960), British runner
 Stewart Binns (born 1950), British author and filmmaker
 Tom Binns (born 1970), British writer, comedian and presenter
 Tony Binns (born 1948), English-New Zealand geographer
 Vicky Binns (born 1981), English actor
 Vivienne Binns (born 1940), Australian painter